Kuvalakkudy  is a village in Tiruchirappalli taluk of Tiruchirappalli district in Tamil Nadu, India.

Demographics 

As per the 2001 census, Kuvalakkudy had a population of 4190 with 2058 males and 2132 females. The sex ratio was 1036 and the literacy rate, 80.16.

References 

 

Villages in Tiruchirappalli district